İlişki Durumu: Karışık is a remake of Full House (South Korean TV series). The Turkish romantic comedy television series first aired on Show TV on July 4, 2015. The series, created by Banu Kiremitçi Bozkurt, is about love, jealousy, pride, and a love game that goes hand in hand with friendship and misunderstandings. İlişki Durumu: Evli is a total of 4 episodes continuing İlişki Durumu: Karışık.

Plot

Aysegul (Seren Şirince) a young girl who lives with her pet cat Minak. Aysegul aspires to be a writer. Her friends trick her into going for a vacation where she meets the famous actor Can Tekin (Berk Oktay) and accidentally vomits on him. She tries her best to apologize, but Can is way too angry at her. Meanwhile, her friends, Ece and Efe sell her house. Aysegul returns to find out she is homeless. With no other option, she decides to go to her former house and request the new owner to let her stay there. It is revealed that the new owner of the house is Can Tiken. After a series of fights, Can finally allows her to stay till she finds shelter but for that she has to do all the house chores for Can. Can is in love with his beautiful fashion designer friend Elif (Eda Ece) but Elif is in love with Murat. Can, Murat and Elif are childhood friends.  
 
A huge party is thrown to which celebrities such as Can Tiken are invited. Aysegul also goes there as she wants to find a producer/director who can accept her script and make her a writer so that she can earn money. Can gets angry on Aysegul's appearance there. At the party, Elif confesses to Murat that she loves him but Murat does not return her feelings and instead tells her that Can is in love with her. Engraged, Elif goes to Can in front of the media and says blames him for being the reason why Murat rejected her. Can replies that he is in love with Ayseguk and the two are going to get married. This leaves everyone, including Aysegul herself, shocked.
At their house, Can makes a deal with Aysegul. Aysegul has to marry Can for six months and do all the house chores and after the end of those months, they will get divorced and Aysegul will get her house. Aysegul agrees to sign the contradict. Another condition of the contract is to keep this deal a secret.

Can Tiken's mother Mediha meets Aysegul and is devastated by Aysegul's lack of proper manners and her incomplete education. Can's father is Dr. Tahsin Tiken, who is a very busy man. Ismail Tiken, Can's grandfather, wholeheartedly welcomes Aysegul to the family and quickly befriends her. He even wants Aysegul and Can to live in his house though Can wants to live in a separate house because of his differences with his father, Tahsin . Aysegul and Can get married. Seeing this, despite the fact that Elif loves Murat, she starts feeling jealous of Aysegul and begins to spend more time with Can. Meanwhile, Murat tells Aysegul that despite her scripts are horrible, he can help her improve her writing and gives her a job. Aysegul finds a hard time completing the household chores as she wants to do only one thing; writing. Meanwhile, Aysegul falls in love with Can while Murat falls in love with Aysegul due to her innocence. When Can discovers Murat loves Aysegul he feels jealous. Later Can also falls in love with Aysegul. Ayşegul's friend Efe becomes Can's best friend and supporter. One day Ayşegul goes to Can and tells her that she wants divorce from him and that she loves him. Can tries a lot to stop the divorce he finally gives up. After the heartbreak, Can decides to re-win Ayşegul and he, with the help of Efe, wins Ayşegul back and the two decide to get married.

On the day of their wedding, Elif lies to Can about being pregnant. Because of this, Can is forced to leave Ayşegul at the wedding table, leaving her heartbroken and depressed. Ece tries to bring Murat to Ayşegul's life whereas Efe still supports Can. Ece and Efe, who were expecting their first child, ask Ayşegul and Can to take care of their child if anything happens to them. Ece and Efe die in a car accident, leaving Ayşegul and Can to take care of their newborn child. Because of the child, Ayşegul and Can come close again but Can has to marry Elif. They name Efe and Ece's baby Ismail, after Can's grandfather and nickname the baby Iso. Can marries Elif and Murat proposes Aysegul and she accepts his proposal. Aysegul takes Iso for vaccination where she meet Can. Aysegul wents to drink water when she saw Madiha and Niazi. Madiha was taking about Elif's fake pregnancy. Madiha suddenly realized that Aysegul was listening everything and runs behind her. She pushes her and knocks her to the ground. Can helps Aysegul to stand on her feet back . Meanwhile, they learn that Aysegul has lost a part of her memory and thinks that she is going to marry Can. Can takes advantage of this situation and starts to spend a lot of time with her. Iso meanwhile starts to live with Can. After a twisting turn Aysegul gets her memory back and kicks Can out of her house and reunites with Murat. Aysegul starts to focus on her novel and Murats spends a lot of time with her which is not bearable for Can. Can heirs Handan to make them separate. Aysegul learns of Elif's feigned pregnancy and threatens her that she will tell this to Can. Elif and Madiha traps Aysegul in their plan and shows that Aysegul pushed Elif and due to this Elif lost her child. Can and Ismail discover the truth. Can gives Elif divorce when he went to talk with her he overhears Elif threatening Murat that if he does not help her stay with Can she will tell Aysegul that Murat was in the fake pregnancy, so he decides to meet with Can to tell the truth he keeps it in a video to show Aysegul but on the other hand Aysegul's and Murat's marriage ceremony is going on when Can enters and destroys everything by kidnapping Aysegul and telling her the truth that Murat has been hiding from her, after listening to the tape she calls Murat and breaks up with him. Can then tries to make things better with Aysegul, Aysegul refuses because Can is still married to Elif on paper he then tells her that he will end his marriage as soon as possible. Elif tells Can that she will divorce him if he gives her Aysegul's house. He refuses and Aysegul go to Elif's house and tell her that she doesn't care if she has the house. Elif then takes her stuff and go to Aysegul's house and stay in it few days later Aysegul left the house and wrote a letter to Can that she will never come back again. She has a new job as a waitress and she got a new small apartment.

International broadcast

Cast

Series overview

References

External links
İlişki Durumu: Karışık (2015)

2015 Turkish television series debuts
2016 Turkish television series endings
Television series produced in Istanbul
Television shows set in Istanbul
Television series set in the 2010s
Turkish drama television series
Turkish romantic comedy television series
Television series by MF Yapım
Show TV original programming
Turkish television series based on South Korean television series